Pedro de Barrientos Lomelin (died 27 December 1658) was a Roman Catholic prelate who served as Bishop of Durango (1655–1658).

Biography
On 31 May 1655, Pedro de Barrientos Lomelin was appointed during the papacy of Pope Alexander VII as Bishop of Durango.
On 16 July 1656, he was consecrated bishop by Francisco Diego Díaz de Quintanilla y de Hevía y Valdés, Bishop of Antequera, Oaxaca. He served as Bishop of Durango until his death on 27 December 1658. While bishop, he was the principal co-consecrator of Mateo de Sagade de Bugueyro, Archbishop of México (1656) He also assisted in the consecration of Nicolás de la Torre Muñoz, Bishop of Santiago de Cuba (1651).

See also
Catholic Church in Mexico

References

External links and additional sources
 (for Chronology of Bishops) 
 (for Chronology of Bishops) 

17th-century Roman Catholic bishops in Mexico
Bishops appointed by Pope Alexander VII
1658 deaths